Lavandula canariensis is a species of flowering plant in the family Lamiaceae, native to the Canary Islands. It was first described by Philip Miller in 1768.

References

canariensis
Flora of the Canary Islands
Plants described in 1768
Taxa named by Philip Miller